Tom Greenwood (born 1 January 1903 - 1 February 1974) was an Anglican bishop.

Greenwood was born in Luddenden Foot, Yorkshire, England, in 1903 and grew up in the local Church of England St. Mary's church.  From a young age he knew that he wanted to serve in the church.  He began his training and ministry with the Church Army, travelling around England holding missions.  In 1926 he was asked to travel to the US to help the fledgling Church Army there with summer missions.  He travelled throughout the southern states and New England leading missions for four summers. Once he decided to study for the priesthood, he attended Knutsford Ordination Test School in Hawarden, Flintshire, Wales to achieve his GED, and then was sponsored by the Bishop of the Arctic to continue his education at Trinity College, Toronto, graduating with an L.Th., and was ordained in 1934.

He was at the Arctic Mission at Fort McPherson from 1934 to 1936 and then, leaving the north, he was curate in St. Paul, Minnesota before returning to England  in 1937 where he was curate  at St John the Baptist's Greenhill, Harrow from 1937 to 1939. Later in 1939 he went to St Peter's, Hale, Greater Manchester as vicar until 1946. In that year he returned to Canada to be the rector of Fort McMurray and then of Yellowknife (1949–1952). He was the Bishop of Yukon from 1952 to 1961. He shared his ministry with his wife Isabel Dunham (Gilbert) Greenwood, a medical doctor who graduated from McGill University Faculty of Medicine in 1935.

Following their time in the North of Canada, they moved in 1961 to Whitegate, Cheshire where Greenwood became the vicar of Whitegate, St. Mary's Parish, and Assistant Bishop of Chester, assisting the Bishop of Chester with confirmations. In 1965, he returned to Canada, as Assistant Bishop of Cariboo, living in Kamloops, British Columbia and serving the diocese while its diocesan, Ralph Dean, was on leave as Executive Officer of the Anglican Communion. From there Tom retired in 1969 and moved to Ottawa, where he was an honorary Assistant Bishop assisting the Bishop of Ottawa, Bishop Reed.

Having always kept his connection to his roots in the Anglican Church Army "Threshold Ministries", he travelled to Toronto, Ontario on February 1, 1974 to attend an annual meeting.  He died of a heart attack upon reaching his destination.  He was survived by his wife Isabel, his son David, and three daughters, Sarah, Mary and Anne, predeceased by a second son Michael (1961).

References

1903 births
University of Toronto alumni
Anglican bishops of Yukon
20th-century Anglican Church of Canada bishops
1974 deaths